The 2007 American Indoor Football Association season was the league's third overall season.  The league champions were the Lakeland Thunderbolts, who defeated the Reading Express in AIFA Championship Bowl I.

Standings

 Green indicates clinched playoff berth
 Purple indicates division champion
 Grey indicates best league record

All-Star game

Located at the Florence Civic Center in Florence, South Carolina on Friday, June 22

Playoffs

American Bowl III: Located at the Florence Civic Center in Florence, South Carolina on Saturday, June 23

External links
 2007 AIFA All-Star Game Rosters

American Indoor Football Association seasons
2007 in American football